Deer in the Works is a short story by Kurt Vonnegut.  It first appeared in Esquire in April 1955, and was anthologized in Welcome to the Monkey House.

After World War II Vonnegut worked as a writer at the General Electric plant in Schenectady, New York. Ilium frequently appears in his writings, and is supposed to be the hometown of his character, Kilgore Trout.

In 1980 the story was made into a short film with a running length of 25 minutes.  The film stars Dennis Dugan in the lead role with supporting roles played by Gordon Jump, Bob Basso, Richard Kline and Bill Walker.  The film was directed by Ron Underwood and the screenplay adaptation was written by Brent Maddock and S. S. Wilson.  The film was produced by Barr Films.

Plot
David Potter, owner of a small town weekly newspaper, decides to get a more secure job.  Despite his wife's misgivings, he applies to be a publicity writer at the mammoth Ilium Works.  Although shaken at seeing how the company immediately plans out his entire career, he accepts the position.  He is then given his first assignment, recording the capture of a deer that has slipped onto the grounds of the Works.  After he and a photographer finish their jobs the deer will be killed and served at a company dinner.

Getting hopelessly lost, Potter views the utter dehumanization of the workers.  Mistaken for a visiting scientist, he joins a party and has several drinks before finding a skirmish line of employees closing in on the deer.  He opens a gate, lets it escape, and then follows it out into the world.

References

Short stories by Kurt Vonnegut
1955 short stories
Works originally published in Esquire (magazine)
Short stories adapted into films